Ronnie van Hout (born 22 January 1962) is a New Zealand artist, living in Melbourne, Australia. He works across a wide variety of media including sculpture, video, painting, photography, embroidery, and sound recordings.

Early life and education
Born in Christchurch on 22 January 1962, van Hout attended the Ilam School of Fine Arts at the University of Canterbury between 1980 and 1982, where he majored in film. In 1999, he gained a Master of Fine Arts from RMIT University, Melbourne.

Exhibitions
Van Hout has exhibited extensively, in Australia, New Zealand and internationally, at private and public galleries.

Major solo shows

2012 Ronnie van Hout: I've Seen Things, The Dowse Art Museum, Lower Hutt 
2011 Ronnie van Hout: Who Goes There, Christchurch Art Gallery
2004 Ronnie van Hout: I've Abandoned Me, Dunedin Public Art Gallery and City Gallery Wellington
2003 No Exit, Part 2, Physics Room, Christchurch

Public sculptures

Van Hout has also produced a number of large-scale or permanent public art works, including Fallen Robot near The Dowse Art Museum, Comin' Down for the Christchurch Art Gallery, Boy Walking installed in Potters Park in Auckland, and Quasi, a hand sculpture currently at City Gallery Wellington.

Awards and recognitions
2004 nominated for the Walters Prize held at Auckland Art Gallery.
2004 Creative New Zealand Berlin Visual Artists Residency at the Künstlerhaus Bethanien, Berlin
2005 recipient of a Laureate award from the Arts Foundation of New Zealand.
2008 Rita Angus Residency, Wellington

Collections

Van Hout's work is held in many public collections including the Auckland Art Gallery, Museum of New Zealand Te Papa Tongarewa, Christchurch Art Gallery and the Public Art Gallery.

Further information

Anthony Byrt Who's There: Ronnie van Hout and the Anti-Hero Aesthetic, Art New Zealand 126, Autumn 2008
John Hurrell, Review of Who Goes There, EyeContact, 27 September 2009
John Hurrell, Review of The Other Mother, EyeContact, 28 June 2011
Tom Cardy, Van Hout's latest hits the Dowse, The DominionPost, 12 July 2012 
 Robert Leonard, Unnerved: The New Zealand Project, Eyeline, no. 73, 2011

References

1962 births
New Zealand artists
21st-century New Zealand sculptors
21st-century New Zealand male artists
People from Christchurch
Living people
Ilam School of Fine Arts alumni
RMIT University alumni
New Zealand embroiderers